Chimbo is a town in, and the seat of Chimbo Canton, Bolívar Province in Ecuador. The closest cities to Chimbo are Guaranda and San Miguel. Chimbo was once known as Benalcazar because the Spanish conquistador Sebastián de Belalcázar stayed there for several days before departing to Quito to fight the colonizers.

The town is sometimes referred to as La Olla or 'The Pot' due to the surrounding geography.

References 
 www.inec.gov.ec
 www.ame.gov.ec

External links 
 Map of the Bolívar Province

Populated places in Bolívar Province (Ecuador)